Wake is the eighth studio by American rock band Floater, released in June 2010. Some of the tracks on this album ("Leave a Light On", "Wondering" and "White Dress") were also recorded during the studio sessions for previous album Stone by Stone. It is Floater's first self-financed and self-released album.

Track listing
"Concentrate"
"Cannonball"
"Wondering"
"Broken Toy"
"Simplest Way of Life"
"White Dress"
"Matadors"
"Leave a Light On"
"Enough"
"You Taught Me"
"Killing Time"
"Let it Go"

References

2010 albums
Floater (band) albums